Abraham Adrian Albert (November 9, 1905 – June 6, 1972) was an American mathematician. In 1939, he received the American Mathematical Society's Cole Prize in Algebra for his work on Riemann matrices.  He is best known for his work on the Albert–Brauer–Hasse–Noether theorem  on finite-dimensional division algebras over number fields and as the developer of Albert algebras, which are also known as exceptional Jordan algebras.

Professional overview
A first generation American, he was born in Chicago and most associated with that city. He received his Bachelor of Science in 1926, Masters in 1927, and PhD in 1928, at the age of 22.  All degrees were obtained from the University of Chicago.  He married around the same time as his graduation. He spent his postdoctoral year at Princeton University and then from 1929 to 1931 he was an instructor at Columbia University. During this period he worked on Abelian varieties and their endomorphism algebras. He returned to Princeton for the opening year of the Institute for Advanced Study in 1933-34 and spent another year in Princeton in 1961-62 as the first Director of the Communications Research Division of IDA (the Institute for Defense Analyses).

From 1931 to 1972, he served on the mathematics faculty at the University of Chicago, where he became chair of the Mathematics Department in 1958 and Dean of the Physical Sciences Division in 1961.

As a research mathematician, he is primarily known for his work as one of the principal developers of the theory of linear associative algebras and as a pioneer in the development of linear non-associative algebras, although all of this grew out of his work on endomorphism algebras of Abelian varieties.

As an applied mathematician, he also did work for the military during World War II and thereafter.  One of his most notable achievements was his groundbreaking work on cryptography. He prepared a manuscript, "Some Mathematical Aspects of Cryptography," for his invited address at a meeting of the American Mathematical Society in November 1941. The theory that developed from this work can be seen in digital communications technologies.

After WWII, he became a forceful advocate favoring government support for research in mathematics on a par with physical sciences. He served on policy-making bodies at the Office of Naval Research, the United States National Research Council, and the National Science Foundation that funneled research grants into mathematics, giving many young mathematicians career opportunities previously unavailable.  Due to his success in helping to give mathematical research a sound financial footing, he earned a reputation as a "statesman for mathematics." Albert was elected a Fellow of the American Academy of Arts and Sciences in 1968.

Publications

Books
 A. A. Albert, Algebras and their radicals, and division algebras, 1928.
 .
 A. A. Albert, Structure of algebras, 1939. Colloquium publications 24, American Mathematical Society, 2003, .
 
 
 
 
 with Rebeun Sandler:

Articles in PNAS

References

Further reading 
 Nancy E. Albert, A3 and His Algebra: How a Boy from Chicago's West Side Became a Force in American Mathematics, iUniverse, Lincoln, NE, 2005. .

External links 
 
 
 Abraham Adrian Albert 1905–1972, A Biographical Memoir by Irving Kaplansky
National Academy of Sciences Biographical Memoir
search on author Abraham Adrian Albert from Google Scholar
 Guide to the Abraham Adrian Albert Papers 1921-2004 from the University of Chicago Special Collections Research Center

1905 births
1972 deaths
20th-century American mathematicians
20th-century American Jews
Algebraists
Fellows of the American Academy of Arts and Sciences
Institute for Advanced Study visiting scholars
Members of the United States National Academy of Sciences
Presidents of the American Mathematical Society
Princeton University faculty
University of Chicago alumni
University of Chicago faculty
Columbia University faculty
People from Chicago
Mathematicians from Illinois